Jeffrey Scott George (born December 8, 1967) is an American former football quarterback who played in the National Football League (NFL) for 14 seasons. He played college football at the University of Illinois at Urbana–Champaign, where he won the Sammy Baugh Trophy, and was selected first overall by the Indianapolis Colts in the 1990 NFL Draft. A member of seven teams during his career, George helped the Atlanta Falcons in 1995 and the Minnesota Vikings in 1999 reach the playoffs and led the league in passing yards during the 1997 season with the Oakland Raiders. George's NFL tenure would also be marked by frequent conflicts with coaches and management, which resulted in his departure from most of his teams.

Early life
George was born in Indianapolis, Indiana. He attended Warren Central High School, where he received the Dial Award for the national high school scholar-athlete of the year in 1985 and was the first Gatorade National Player of the Year. He attended Purdue University and the University of Illinois.

College career
George transferred after a year at Purdue when the coach who recruited him, Leon Burtnett, resigned. Burtnett's replacement was Fred Akers, who had been known for his teams that used a run-heavy option type offense that required a more mobile quarterback. George subsequently committed to the University of Miami, but he backed out when coach Jimmy Johnson would not guarantee him a starting job. George stayed at Illinois for two years, leaving with a year of eligibility remaining after being assured he would be drafted as one of the first five picks of the NFL draft (he was picked No. 1 overall).

He would finish his college career with 6,212 yards, to go with 35 touchdowns and 35 interceptions.  In 1989, his final year as a college player, he threw for 2,738 yards, with 22 TD vs 12 INT.

Professional career

Indianapolis Colts
The Colts traded up to draft George, making him the first pick in the 1990 draft, and signed him to the richest rookie contract in NFL history at the time (worth a total of $15 million). George threw 46 interceptions to 41 touchdowns and lost 35 of his 49 career starts as a Colt; his only winning season with the Colts was 1992, during which he played ten games and threw 15 interceptions to seven touchdowns. Before the 1993 season, he refused to report to training camp and only returned to the team when Jim Irsay made it clear that George would have to pay a huge penalty fee for breach of contract if he did not get back to work. The Colts traded George to the Atlanta Falcons after the 1993 season.

Atlanta Falcons
In 1995, George led the Falcons to their first playoff appearance since 1991. On September 22, 1996, in a game against the Philadelphia Eagles, George got into a heated argument on the sidelines with Falcons coach June Jones, all of which was caught on camera for a national television audience. Jones suspended George for the remainder of the 1996 season. It was later confirmed that George blamed team management for his problems and felt Jones betrayed him by not standing up to this alleged mistreatment. Years after the incident, Jones became an advocate for George, stating that the TV argument was overblown and that George was a good quarterback, a team player and worthy of being on an NFL roster.

George's record with the Falcons was 16–19; he had the best completion percentage (60.5) of his career with 50 touchdowns and 32 interceptions.

Oakland Raiders
George signed with the Oakland Raiders for the 1997 after leaving the Falcons. The Oilers, in their first home game since their controversial relocation from Houston, ruined George's debut (he threw three touchdowns to Tim Brown) by beating the Raiders, 24-21, on an Al Del Greco field goal in overtime. A notable moment for the Silver and Black came in Week 8; against the visiting Broncos, George delivered a workmanlike performance (9-12, 96 yards, 2 TD, 1 INT). Thanks in large part to Napoleon Kaufman's 227-yard performance on the ground, the host Raiders upset the eventual world champions, 28-25. In his eighth year in the NFL, he had arguably his finest statistical year, throwing  for 29 touchdown passes and 9 interceptions, for a 91.2 passer rating. However, despite George's stellar statistics, the team struggled overall; their defense finished 28th in scoring. Oakland finished 4–12 in Joe Bugel's one and only season as the Raiders' head coach.

The following year, the offense changed to head coach Jon Gruden's West Coast offense, a controlled-pass approach which did not suit George's strengths. George was inconsistent at the beginning of the year, and later struggled with a groin pull, telling a local radio audience that he was finished for the year. He also ignored the offensive coordinator's play calls during the 1998 season and ran his own plays through a wristband containing plays (in an interview, George told Joe Theismann that he did what the coaches wanted on 1st and 2nd down, and simply threw it to Tim Brown on 3rd down). The Raiders essentially ended George's Oakland tenure when they signed free-agent quarterback Rich Gannon.

Minnesota Vikings
After being cut by Oakland, George initially found himself without anywhere to play in 1999; an article at SI.com had several coaches (including Dick Vermeil, Mike Ditka, and Mike Holmgren) go on record about how George wasn't a winner and would not be considered by them despite their own poor/uncertain QB issues. However, the article also said that the Vikings had interest in George at a low salary to be the backup to Randall Cunningham, and George accepted that offer before training camp began. Cunningham struggled at the start of the 1999 season and was benched, and George took over the starting role. In 10 games as a starter George went 8–2 with 23 touchdowns, 8.6 yards per attempt, and a 94.2 rating, in leading Minnesota to the playoffs. George then earned his first career playoff win, throwing three touchdown passes to lead the Vikings over the Dallas Cowboys, 27–10. The Vikings lost the next week to the eventual Super Bowl champion St. Louis Rams, 49–37. Minnesota wanted George to return in 2000 but the combination of him delaying contract talks and the team's confidence that Daunte Culpepper could take over at QB led the Vikings to cut ties with him. George ended up signing with the Washington Redskins.

Washington Redskins
George hoped to return to Minnesota as a starting quarterback but was told by head coach Dennis Green to "shop around". After attempting to speak to other teams about securing a starting quarterback job, he was eventually offered a one-year, $400,000 contract by Minnesota, with incentives of up to $1.4 million. Rather than sign with the Vikings, George signed a four-year contract worth $14.8 million with the Washington Redskins as Brad Johnson's backup. Johnson went down in week 9; George replaced him and went 1–2 in the next three games. Johnson returned but played poorly against the New York Giants. George replaced him and started two games, both losses, after Norv Turner was fired in favor of interim coach Terry Robiskie. After the season, Johnson departed Washington for Tampa Bay, leaving George as the Redskins' starter going into 2001.

Before the 2001 season, Washington hired as head coach Marty Schottenheimer, who promised to install a West Coast scheme similar to that of Gruden in Oakland. George clashed with Schottenheimer over the offense, though the coach promised to work George through any problems he might have with the scheme. Washington released George after a 37–0 Monday Night loss to the Green Bay Packers, in which George had a 34.6 passer rating, the worst in the first two weeks of the 2001 season. The Redskins were 0–2, having been outscored 67–3. George was given 24 hours to remove his personal items from the Redskins' facilities before they were discarded. He was replaced by Tony Banks, who led the team to finish the season with an 8-8 record after they had begun with a record of 0-5.

Seattle Seahawks
George seemingly retired after his last game in Washington, but he proceeded to make several sideline appearances in the following years.  He signed briefly with the Seattle Seahawks in late 2002 as an emergency quarterback.

Chicago Bears
In 2004, after two years away from the game, George joined his seventh club, the Chicago Bears. It was a homecoming of sorts, George having played college football with the Illini. The Bears signed George to a one-year contract in November, intending to have him for a backup role; he never took the field during a game. George was not retained by the Bears for the 2005 season, nor was he signed by any other team. The Detroit Lions worked him out during their bye week but did not offer him a contract.

Oakland Raiders (second stint)
On August 28, 2006, the Oakland Raiders signed George. He was expected to compete for the third-string quarterback position. However, he was released during final cuts only five days later on September 2, 2006.

NFL career statistics

Retirement
While George spent time on active NFL rosters through 2006, he had not attempted a pass since the 2001 season with the Washington Redskins. It was speculated that he might have replaced third-string quarterback Marques Tuiasosopo due to his friendship with Randy Moss. Moss has previously stated that George was his favorite of all the quarterbacks he's worked with. He has also commented in the past that he and George would take weekend fishing trips together when they both lived in Minnesota.

On October 30, 2007, during Mike and Mike in the Morning, Michael Kim in a SportsCenter update reported that George was interested in making another comeback, this time with the Minnesota Vikings, a team where he once had some success.

In November 2008, in an appearance on Sirius NFL Radio, George said, "I find it hard to believe there isn't a place in the game for me. My arm feels like I'm 25", he said. "I'm not asking to be a starter, I just want a spot on a team. I still hold out hope I can play in this league. I'm working out three or four days a week, staying ready. Some people might laugh about it. I've been hearing the excuse, 'You're too old,' but I look at guys now playing near 40, and if you can throw it like I can throw it ... Why wouldn't you take a look at me?" He said of coming back: "I’ve been trying to figure out how to get back in, and it just amazes me that I’m not on somebody's roster. I’ve been throwing two or three times a week, and every time I go out there to throw, I can’t believe I’m not a backup somewhere. I know it's a young man's game, but you can’t tell me I’m not better than some of the quarterbacks that are out there. I look at teams like Minnesota or Chicago, and I want to scream at the people in charge, ‘What are you thinking?’"

On August 4, 2010, George announced on KFAN Sports radio in Minnesota that he would have been willing to step in for veteran QB Brett Favre if Favre had decided to retire from the Minnesota Vikings.

Personal life
His son, Jeff Jr., followed in his father's footsteps and played quarterback for the University of Illinois before transferring to the University of Pittsburgh.

Media
George has made occasional appearances on NFL Total Access with Rich Eisen and Terrell Davis. Following George's final seasons in the NFL, Jason Whitlock wrote several columns expressing his belief that George could still play and was deserving of an NFL try-out. George and Whitlock are longtime friends, having played high school football together.

References

External links
Jeff George career stats – at ESPN.com

1967 births
Living people
Players of American football from Indianapolis
American football quarterbacks
Illinois Fighting Illini football players
Purdue Boilermakers football players
National Football League first-overall draft picks
Indianapolis Colts players
Atlanta Falcons players
Oakland Raiders players
Minnesota Vikings players
Washington Redskins players
Chicago Bears players